R (European Roma Rights Centre) v Immigration Officer at Prague Airport [2004] UKHL 55 is a UK asylum case concerning Article 33 of the Convention Relating to the Status of Refugees. The case concerned itself with the lawfulness of actions taken by British immigration personnel stationed in Prague. The outcome found that discriminatory actions were undertaken against Roma seeking to travel to the UK.

Facts
British immigration officials pre-cleared passengers boarding flights within Immigration Rules. If officers concluded that the passengers would claim asylum once they arrived, they would be refused entry. The ERRC brought this action, alleging direct discrimination, on behalf of a group of asylum-seekers. The claimants, represented by Lester QC, said that the Government, represented by Greenwood QC, was breaching its international obligations.

The Court of Appeal distanced itself from the "but for" test by a majority, holding that there was no discrimination. Laws LJ dissented.

Judgment
The House of Lords held the system was inherently and systematically discriminatory, contrary to RRA 1976 s 1(1)(a). Roma were deliberately intensively questioned because the officers knew that practically all Czech asylum seekers were Roma. So, applying Nagarajan v London Regional Transport, they were treated less favourably on racial grounds, contrary to domestic and international law. Lord Steyn said the following.

Baroness Hale also said that the "object of the legislation is to ensure that each person is treated as an individual and not assumed to be like other members of the group." The legislation "makes no reference at all to justification in relation to direct discrimination. Nor, strictly, does it allow indirect discrimination to be justified. It accepts that a requirement or condition may be justified independently of its discriminatory effect."

The appeal, however, failed in that there was no international law that required the Roma to be allowed into the country before they applied for asylum.

Lord Bingham, Lord Hope and Lord Carswell gave concurring judgments.

See also

 Convention Relating to the Status of Refugees
 Sale v. Haitian Centers Council

Notes

References

External links
Text of the judgment at Refworld

Anti-discrimination law in the United Kingdom
Romani in the United Kingdom
Romani rights
United Kingdom labour case law
United Kingdom right of asylum case law
House of Lords cases
2004 in case law
2004 in British law